First Presbyterian Church of West Chester is a historic Presbyterian church located at 130 W. Miner Street in West Chester, Chester County, Pennsylvania.  It was designed in 1832 by Thomas U. Walter, who later became the fourth Architect of the Capitol.  The church is a stuccoed stone building measuring 75 feet long and 45 feet wide in the Greek Revival style.  Additions were built in 1860 and 1955. The front facade features a recessed porch flanked by two projections with pilasters.

It was added to the National Register of Historic Places in 1972.

References

External links

Official Website
 First Presbyterian Church, 130 West Miner Street, West Chester, Chester County, PA: 3 photos and 14 data pages at Historic American Buildings Survey

Historic American Buildings Survey in Pennsylvania
Churches on the National Register of Historic Places in Pennsylvania
Presbyterian churches in Pennsylvania
Churches completed in 1832
Greek Revival church buildings in Pennsylvania
19th-century Presbyterian church buildings in the United States
Churches in Chester County, Pennsylvania
West Chester, Pennsylvania
Thomas U. Walter church buildings
National Register of Historic Places in Chester County, Pennsylvania